The 1970–71 Regionalliga  was the eighth season of the Regionalliga, the second tier of the German football league system. The league operated in five regional divisions, Berlin, North, South, Southwest and West. The five league champions and all five runners-up, at the end of the season, entered a promotion play-off to determine the two clubs to move up to the Bundesliga for the next season. The two promotion spots went to the Regionalliga West champions and runners-up VfL Bochum and Fortuna Düsseldorf.

Regionalliga Nord									
The 1970–71 season saw three new clubs in the league, SV Meppen, SC Sperber Hamburg and Heider SV, all three promoted from the Amateurliga, while no club had been relegated from the Bundesliga to the league.

Regionalliga Berlin									
The 1970–71 season saw two new clubs in the league, VfL Nord Berlin and Alemannia 90 Berlin, both promoted from the Amateurliga, while no club had been relegated from the Bundesliga to the league.

Regionalliga West									
The 1970–71 season saw three new clubs in the league, Eintracht Gelsenkirchen and Westfalia Herne, both promoted from the Amateurliga, while Alemannia Aachen had been relegated from the Bundesliga to the league.

Regionalliga Südwest									
The 1970–71 season saw two new clubs in the league, VfB Theley and VfR Frankenthal, both promoted from the Amateurliga, while no club had been relegated from the Bundesliga to the league.

Regionalliga Süd									
The 1970–71 season saw four new clubs in the league, SV Göppingen, FC Wacker München and Viktoria Aschaffenburg, all threepromoted from the Amateurliga, while TSV 1860 München had been relegated from the Bundesliga to the league.

Bundesliga promotion round

Group 1

Group 2

References

Sources
 30 Jahre Bundesliga  30th anniversary special, publisher: kicker Sportmagazin, published: 1993
 kicker-Almanach 1990  Yearbook of German football, publisher: kicker Sportmagazin, published: 1989, 
 DSFS Liga-Chronik seit 1945  publisher: DSFS, published: 2005

External links
Regionalliga on the official DFB website 
kicker 
Das Deutsche Fussball Archiv  Historic German league tables

1970-71
2
Ger